Niall Kearney (born 10 March 1988) is an Irish professional golfer. Kearney enjoyed a successful amateur career, playing in the 2009 Walker Cup. He won the Irish PGA Championship in 2014 and 2015. He played in the 2015 PGA Cup and, in the last singles match, holed an 8-foot putt to win his match and give Great Britain and Ireland their first PGA Cup victory in America.

Amateur wins
2009 Brabazon Trophy

Professional wins (3)
2014 Irish PGA Championship, PGA Play-offs
2015 Irish PGA Championship

Team appearances
Amateur
European Boys' Team Championship (representing Ireland): 2005
Jacques Léglise Trophy (representing Great Britain & Ireland): 2006 (captain)
European Amateur Team Championship (representing Ireland): 2008, 2009
Walker Cup (representing Great Britain & Ireland): 2009 (winners)

Professional
PGA Cup (representing Great Britain and Ireland): 2015 (winners)

References

External links

Irish male golfers
European Tour golfers
Sportspeople from Dublin (city)
1988 births
Living people